is a Japanese animated television series based on the Wild Arms series of video games. The series was animated by Bee Train, and directed by Itsuro Kawasaki and Kōichi Mashimo. Twilight Venom aired on WOWOW from October 18, 1999, to March 27, 2000, totaling 22 episodes.

Plot 
The story follows the exploits of a gunslinger named Sheyenne Rainstorm, who is trapped in the body of a 10-year-old boy. Though he does know what happened to his old body, he is equipped with the powerful ARMS weapon, which is one of the most destructive weapons in the whole world. While imprisoned, he runs into the bandit Kiel Aronnax, vampire girl Mirabelle, and card-throwing dame Loretta. Once the quartet escape prison, they are equipped with a famous and mysterious ARMS weapon. The series follows Sheyenne and his newfound allies as they search for the mystery of Sheyenne's missing body. Along the way, they discover more about the ARMS weapon and how it can change the fate of the world.

Characters 

 Sheyenne Rainstorm is a famous gunslinger with the ability to use the mysterious ARMS weapons. He was rumored to have been a reincarnation from the Evil Race due to his birthmark on his back and his ability to remain unharmed when using the ARMS. 3 years before the series start, he was mysteriously shot, and his brain transplanted into the body of a 10-year-old. His original body was moved somewhere else, and Sheyenne spends the entire series looking for it. As an adult, Sheyenne was a vain playboy who easily attracted the attention of women due to his handsome visage. After being reborn, he constantly laments the loss of such attention throughout the series. He travels mainly with Kiel and Isaac, but frequently meets the female thieves by accident. He and Loretta often butt heads. .

 Dr. Kiel Aronnax is a scientist who had been imprisoned and tortured at Alcatraz. He eventually escapes due to the distraction of Loretta's group infiltrating the prison, and leads them to the treasure - which turns out to be a sleeping Sheyenne. Afterwards, he goes along to help Sheyenne find his body. Unlike the common scientist stereotype, Kiel has the build of a brawler, and the skills to beat down his opponents. While Kiel does serve as the moral compass and the occasional father figure (to the chagrin of Sheyenne, who's commonly mistaken as his son) in the group, Kiel also has his fair share of secrets, the biggest of which involves Sheyenne. .
 Loretta Oratorio is a thief and crest sorceress, she spends her time with Mirabelle and Jerusha stealing from the rich and treasure hunting. To her chagrin, they frequently run into Sheyenne's group and as a result, often lose the treasure. So much so that both Loretta and Mirabelle dubbed Sheyenne as the "God of Poverty" and resolved to run away the next time they see him. Loretta is aware of her own beauty, and one of her most common ploys is to use her body to distract unwary victims before robbing them. She is not without skills, however, as shown in episode 9, "The Slave of the Game", where she becomes the top female grappler. She is a proficient crest sorceress, but is limited by her obsession with the monetary value of the crest. As a thief and treasure-hunter, Loretta is prone to doing nearly anything to get to the valuables, up to and including pretending to be a long lost heiress and joining an all-female robbery gang. However, she has shown to adhere to a moral code when it comes to obtaining crests, and is visibly outraged when someone has broken it. .
 Mirabelle Graceland is a member of the vampire-like race, the Crimson Nobles. She and Loretta make their living stealing and treasure-hunting. She seems to have a slight crush on Sheyenne, though that might be because she (and every other Crimson Noble) finds his blood incredibly delicious. Crimson Nobles have the ability to transform into strange bat-like creatures, and Mirabelle often transforms easily between the two forms, though others have remarked on her slow flying. .
 Jerusha is a 5000-year-old Popepi Pipepo who assists Loretta and Mirabelle during their travels. Jerusha has been married 5 or 6 times, one of which is to Issac. The two argue whenever they meet, and Jerusha often flouts Issac's tentative moves to rekindle their relationship. Despite the antagonism, Jerusha does harbor similar feelings towards Issac (whom she calls Isaku, to his annoyance). .
 Isaac is a 5000-year-old Popepi Pipepo who assists Sheyenne and Kiel during his travels. He first appears in a cage at a market stall, though it's later revealed that the shop is actually his and the shopkeeper his apprentice. Due to the low numbers of Popepi Pipepo, he becomes interested when Sheyenne mentions meeting a female Popei Pipepo and decides to leave with them in hopes in meeting her. To his dismay, it's his ex-wife, Jerusha. However, even though Issac treats Jerusha like an enemy, he still has harbors feelings for her and has even remarked that being married was the happiest time of his life. .

Episodes
Sleeping Dirty
ARMS Crazy
Desert Dragon Fantasy
The Faluna Bible
Portrait of Lana
Affair of the Fargaia Express
Someday My Robber Will Come
Mouth Wide Shut
The Slave of the Game
Guilty or...
No Home, No Body
Lie, Laila, Lie
Lullaby of the Noble-Red
Interview With The Ampire
Natural Born Angel
Fatal Goddess
Child at Heart
The Days of the Bacchus
Gone with the Smoke
Faluna Struck
Once Upon a Time in Fargaia
The Last of Sheyenne

Volumes
The series was also distributed on five DVD compilation volumes titles. The first was 125 minutes, the following four were 100 each:
 Volume 1: The Good, The Bad and The Greedy (1-5) 5eps
 Volume 2: Western Romance (6-9) 4eps
 Volume 3: The Return of Laila (10-13) 4eps
 Volume 4: Lie, Cheat & Steal (14-17) 4eps
 Volume 5: Sheyennes Last Stand (18-22) 5eps

The "Complete Collection" was divided it into 4 discs: 1-5, 6-10, 11-16 and 17-22 (5/5/6/6 eps)

Relation to the Wild Arms game series 
Twilight Venom has various crossovers with the second installment of the Wild Arms series. Models of Liz and Ard are visible inside a monster museum in episode 11, "No Home, No Body". Judecca makes an appearance in episode 15 (a character with the likeness of Zed from the first Wild Arms also appears) and Kanon from Wild Arms 2 in episode 17. Irving Vold Valeria (Wild Arms 2) and the Guardian Lucied (multiple games) appear in episode 16, but unlike all other cameos, appear in future episodes and have a connection to the storyline.

References

External links 
 
 

1999 anime television series debuts
Adventure anime and manga
Anime television series based on video games
Aniplex
Bee Train Production
Western (genre) anime and manga
Wild Arms
Works based on Sony Interactive Entertainment video games